The 21 cm Granatwerfer 69 was a mortar used by Germany during World War II. This weapon may also be known as the GR 19 and B 19 or by its nickname "Elefant".

The prototype was built by Skoda as the 22 cm sGrW B 14, but was redesigned to 21 cm at OKH's request to use existing ammunition. In firing position, the wheels rested in shoes that rested on a semicircular rail track. The baseplate was attached to the mount by a ball joint to allow for traverse without reseating the baseplate. Elevation was obtained by rack and pinion on the upright legs. The firing mechanism was built into the breech ring and was of the continuous pull type. It was designed to be towed as a complete unit, the baseplate riding above the tube.

Notes

Sources
 Gander, Terry and Chamberlain, Peter. Weapons of the Third Reich: An Encyclopedic Survey of All Small Arms, Artillery and Special Weapons of the German Land Forces 1939-1945. New York: Doubleday, 1979 

World War II mortars of Germany
210 mm artillery
Weapons and ammunition introduced in 1944